An organization or organisation is an entity, such as an institution or an association, that has a collective goal and is linked to an external environment.

Organization or organisation may also refer to:

Arts and media

Music
 Organisation (album), 1980 album by Orchestral Manoeuvres in the Dark
 Organisation (band) (1969–1970), German band that was the predecessor to Kraftwerk 
 The Organization (band) (1991–1995), heavy metal band from San Francisco, California
 Universal Zulu Nation, a.k.a. "The Organization", an international "hip hop awareness group"

Other media
 Organization (journal), an academic journal of management and organization studies
 The Organization (film), a 1971 American film
 Organizations (book), 1958 novel
 The Organization (TV series), a 1972 British television drama series
 Organization XIII, the villains in Kingdom Hearts: Chain of Memories and Kingdom Hearts II

Other uses
 Formation of granulation tissue, in pathology
 The O (political group) ("The Organization"), in US, led by Theo Smith
 "The Organization", a former Cambodia governing body Angkar led by Pol Pot; see Communist Party of Kampuchea
 The Organization, an alternative name for the Chicago Outfit, a crime syndicate
 Organization (LDS Church), a secondary body of church government in the LDS Church

See also
 Self-organization, the emergence of order in an initially disordered system.
 Organizer (disambiguation)
 Organizing (disambiguation)